The 1989 Full Members' Cup final was the fourth Full Members' Cup final, contested by Everton and Nottingham Forest at Wembley Stadium on 30 April 1989.

Background
English teams were banned from Europe and the Football League started a new cup for sides in the top two leagues. Nottingham Forest had already won the League Cup, while Everton were awaiting their FA Cup final. Both Everton and Nottingham Forest had been exempt from the first two rounds of the competition, due to their high league finish in the 1987–88 season, with Forest finishing third and the Toffees fourth.

Route to the final

Everton

Nottingham Forest

Teams

Match summary
Everton took the lead through Tony Cottee, before being pegged back from a goal by Garry Parker. Graeme Sharp restored Everton's lead after the break, before Parker sent the game into extra-time with an equaliser. In extra-time, Lee Chapman put Nottingham Forest ahead for the first time in the match. Cottee scored his second to level the match at 3–3. Chapman scored his second, three minutes from time, to win the trophy for Forest.

Details

References

Full Members' Cup 1989
Full Members' Cup 1989
1989
1988–89 in English football
April 1989 sports events in the United Kingdom
1989 sports events in London